Knapp Lake is a small natural lake located in western Noble County, Indiana.

Knapp Lake is directly attached to Little Bause Lake via a channel and Little Knapp Lake on the south and southwest and Moss Lake to the north. Little Bause has development around its shores while Little Knapp is undeveloped. Harper Lake and Gilbert Lake, both undeveloped for the most part form the southern part of the Papakeechie watershed as it flows northward to Lake Wawasee through Moss Lake.

The southwest, northeast and north shores comprise the bulk of the homes on the lake. The north shore has five man-made channels. The northwest shore is forested. Farmland surrounds mostly the east and south beyond inhabited areas.

In 1999, with the assistance of the Indiana Department of Natural Resources, the Wawasee Property Owners Association purchased  of land and wetlands on Knapp Lake and  surrounding Little Knapp Lake.

Sources

Lakes of Indiana
Lakes of Noble County, Indiana